Middle Torch Key is an island in the lower Florida Keys.

It is located between Ramrod Key and Little Torch Key.

The southernmost tip of the key is on U.S. 1 (or the Overseas Highway), at approximately mile marker 28.

Like the other Torch Keys, it was probably named for the native Torchwood tree.

Flora and fauna
The Florida Keys mole skink has been seen on Middle Torch Key and other Florida Keys, although it is rarely seen.

References

Islands of the Florida Keys
Islands of Monroe County, Florida
Unincorporated communities in Monroe County, Florida
Islands of Florida
Unincorporated communities in Florida